Music from My Mind is the seventh and final studio album from the artist, producer and composer Michael Jones also known as Kashif. The album was released in 2004 on Brooklyn Boy Entertainment. A two-disc set, the first includes eight new songs while the second includes three new songs and a remastered version of Kashif, his debut album from 1983.

Track listing

Disc 1

Disc 2

References

[ Allmusic]
Discogs

External links

Music From My Mind at Discogs

2004 albums
Kashif (musician) albums